Stallingsia is a genus of butterflies in the skipper family, Hesperiidae.

Selected species
Stallingsia jacki
Stallingsia maculosus
Stallingsia smithi

References
Natural History Museum Lepidoptera genus database

External links

Megathyminae
Hesperiidae genera